Persatuan Sepakbola Bungo (simply known as PS Bungo) is an Indonesian football club based in Bungo Regency, Jambi. They currently compete in the Liga 3.

References

External links
Persibut Bungo Liga-Indonesia.co.id

Football clubs in Indonesia
Football clubs in Jambi